Romain Mahieu (born 17 February 1995) is a French male BMX rider, representing his nation at international competitions. He competed in the time trial event at the 2015 UCI BMX World Championships.

References

External links
 
 
 
 

1995 births
Living people
BMX riders
French male cyclists
Olympic cyclists of France
Cyclists at the 2020 Summer Olympics
Place of birth missing (living people)